Taras Kostyuk is a Canadian actor and a stuntman. Taras was born in Lviv, Ukraine, and starred in featured films & TV shows since 1997.

Filmography
2014 Rockland Boulevard (pre-production) - Vlad
2014 Kowel's Voice (pre-production) - Ukrainian Guard
2013 RockLand (pre-production) - Security Man
2014 Hunting for the Icon 2 (post-production) - Grob
2013 Hunting for the Icon (completed) 
2013 Elysium - Spider's Ship Smuggler
2013 Arctic Air (TV series) - Ace (episode: Ts'inada)
2013 Red Widow (TV series) - Russian Doorman (episode: The Recorder)
2011 InSecurity (TV series) - Sergey (episode: Keeping Up with the Laslovs)
2010 Supernatural (TV series) - Spike (episode: All Dogs Go to Heaven, uncredited)
2010 Transparency - Brothel Door Man
2010 The Killing Machine - Boris
2009 The Zero Sum - Sasha
2009 Ratko: The Dictator's Son - Kostka's Bodyguard (as Taras Kostyuk)
2008 Ice Blues - Darwin
2008 Yeti: Curse of the Snow Demon (TV movie) - Yeti
2008 Black Harvest (short) - Angry Russian Assassin
2007 Alien Agenda: Project Grey - Russian Captain
2007 Coffee Diva (short) -Rudolfo (as Taras)
2006 The Evidence (TV series) - Duncan (episode: Stringers)
2006 Spymate - Melmar
2005 Masters of Horror (TV series) - Kaspar (episode: John Carpenter's Cigarette Burns)
2005 Sub Zero (video) - Boxer
2004 Andromeda (TV series) - Thug #1 (episode: The Weight: Part 2)
2004 White Chicks - Russian
2001-2004 The Chris Isaak Show (TV series) - Bouncer / Mike
 The Candidate (2004) ... Mike (as Taras)
 Smackdown (2001) ... Bouncer
2003 Jake 2.0 (TV series) - Russian Man #1 (episode: Double Agent)
2003 Mob Princess (TV movie) - Cigar store worker
2003 Stephen King's Dead Zone (TV series) - Strong Man (episode: The Storm, uncredited)
2003 Barely Legal - Bouncer #2
2003 Taking Out the Don (short) - Grob
2003 A Wrinkle in Time (TV movie) - Double Brow Alien (uncredited)
2002 I Spy - Siberian Guard #2 (uncredited)
2002 Jeremiah (TV series) - Yarbo (episode: Ring of Truth)
2002 The Untold (video) - Sasquatch
2002 UC: Undercover (TV series) - Another Guard (episode: Teddy C)
2001 MTV's Now What? (TV series) - Bodyguard (episode: The Tux)
2001 Night Visions (TV series) - Man in Blue (episode: Still Life)
2001 Mindstorm
2001 Dark Angel (TV series) - Red Seven
Rising (2001) ... Red Seven
Red (2001) ... Red Seven
2000 The Operative - Iashin
1997 Death Game (TV movie) - Centurion

External links
 
 Private website
 Taras Kostyuk at kinofilms.ua
 Taras Kostyuk at TVguide

1966 births
Living people
Actors from Lviv
Russian male television actors
Russian male film actors
Ukrainian emigrants to Canada